California or Bust is a 1927 American silent comedy-drama film, directed by Phil Rosen. It stars George O'Hara, Helen Foster, and John Steppling, and was released on January 9, 1927.

Plot
Jeff Daggett is a mechanic in the fictional town of Rockett, Arizona.  He owns a local garage, but he leaves the day-to-day operation of the garage to his assistant, the mechanic. Daggett spends all his time on developing a new car motor.

While they are driving west to California, the president of a motor company, Holtwood, and his daughter Nadine are passing through Rockett when their car breaks down. When Daggett comes to service them, he begins talking about his new motor. When they get back to the garage, Holtwood contacts his chief engineer, Wade Rexton, to come out from California to take a look at the motor.

When he arrives, Rexton realizes the potential of the engine, but as he watches the interaction between Daggett and Nadine, he sees Daggett as a competitor for Nadine's affections and becomes jealous. Instead of praising Daggett's motor, he denigrates it, and challenges Daggett to a race, with Rexton in a car with a Holtwood motor, and Daggett in a car using his own design. After the race starts, Rexton is waylayed on the highway by a robber. As Daggett reaches Rexton, they take off after the robber, and eventually catch him, retrieving the car.  After they return to Rockett, Holtwood offers Daggett a job, which he accepts.

Cast list
 George O'Hara as Jeff Daggett
 Helen Foster as Nadine Holtwood
 John Steppling as President Holtwood
 Johnny Fox as Mechanic
 Irving Bacon as Wade Rexton

Production
In November 1926, Byron Morgan finished the screenplay for California or Bust, which was to be a vehicle for George O'Hara. Initially, it was reported that the film was to be directed by Alf Goulding. By late November the film was in production with Phil Rosen at the helm. In addition to O'Hara, Helen Foster, John Steppling, John Fox Jr., and Irving Bacon were announced to be in the cast. At the beginning of January it was revealed that Al Boasberg had been brought in to work on the titles. Portions of the film were shot on location in Southern California. Filming on the project was completed by the middle of December.

References

External links 
 
 
 

1927 films
1920s English-language films
1927 comedy-drama films
Films directed by Phil Rosen
American silent feature films
American black-and-white films
Film Booking Offices of America films
1920s American films
Silent American comedy-drama films